Georgians in Turkey refers to citizens and denizens of Turkey who are, or descend from, ethnic Georgians.

Numbers and distribution 

In the census of 1965, those who spoke Georgian as first language were proportionally most numerous in Artvin (3.7%), Ordu (0.9%) and Kocaeli (0.8%).

Georgians live scattered throughout Turkey, although they are primarily concentrated in two major regions:

 The Black Sea coast, in the provinces of Giresun, Ordu, Samsun, Sinop, Amasya, and Tokat. Chveneburi Georgians (particularly in Fatsa, Ünye, Ordu, Terme, and Çarşamba) largely preserve their language and traditions.
 Northwestern Turkey, in the provinces of Düzce, Sakarya, Yalova, Kocaeli, Bursa, and Balıkesir.

Magnarella estimated the number of Georgians in Turkey to have been over 60,000 in 1979.

Imerkhevians 

Imerkhevians (Shavshetians) are an ethnographic subgroup of Georgians who speak the Imerkhevian dialect (imerkheuli) of the Georgian language, which shares many common features with the neighboring Adjarian. Imerkhevians are the indigenous population of Artvin Province.

The majority of the Imerkhevians today live in an area they call Imerkhevi. The population of Imerkhevi is largely composed of ethnic Georgians, who inhabit 14 hamlets around Meydancık (formerly known as Diobani). These settlements have both official Turkish and unofficial Georgian names. Reflecting some internal differentiation persisting in Turkey's Georgian community, the Imerkhevians claim a different origin from the Georgians in the Borçka area, who have adopted an inclusive Adjar identity. The Imerkhevians are Sunni Muslims, closely integrated with the Turkish society. Almost all are bilingual in Georgian and Turkish.

Chveneburi 
Chveneburi, meaning "of us" in Georgian, is an endonym of Georgian-descended Muslim immigrants who had settled in non-Georgian majority regions of Turkey, thus, "of us" signifies a triple distinction from Christian Georgians, Muslim Turks, and autochthonous Muslim Georgians from Artvin. As with most Turkish citizens, most Chveneburi subscribe to the Hanafi madh'hab of Sunni Islam.

Chveneburi Georgians had arrived in Turkey in three waves of migration due to pogroms by the Russian Empire, in what is now called the Circassian genocide. The first wave was during and after the 1828-1829 Russo-Turkish War, when the Sublime Porte consigned its sovereignty over several parts of Georgia to the Russian Empire.

Minor waves of immigration followed until the end of the 1877-1878 Russo-Turkish War, when the Ottoman Empire allowed Chveneburis to immigrate. This wave of immigration involved at least 500,000 people from historic Georgian regions that had considerable Muslim populations, such as Batumi and Kars. As a result, many Muslim-majority regions of Georgia were left virtually depopulated.

The last sizable wave of immigration was in 1921, when Turkey finally gave up its claims on Adjara in the Treaty of Kars with the Soviet republics. This last wave also involved Turkish-speaking Muslims from Upper Adjara. Adjarians were also known by their places of origin, such as Batumlular for people from Batumi or Çürüksulular for people from Kobuleti.

Press 
The most important Georgian cultural magazine in Turkey also bears the name Çveneburi. It was founded in 1977 in Stockholm, Sweden by Shalva Tevzadze. It is distributed in Turkey by Ahmet Özkan Melashvili, who also wrote the book Gürcüstan (Georgia) in 1968. In 1980, Özkan was assassinated in Bursa by the Grey Wolves. Since then, Fahrettin Çiloğlu has been in charge of the magazine. Between 1997 and 2006, Osman Nuri Mercan was the editor of the magazine. The magazine's content is almost completely in Turkish, and presents articles on Chveneburi Georgians, the history of Georgia, and Georgians worldwide. Another journal, Pirosmani, bilingual in Georgian and Turkish, is published in Istanbul, sponsored by the Georgian Catholic Simon Zazadze.

See also 
Georgia–Turkey relations
Peoples of the Caucasus in Turkey
Islam in Georgia
Adjarians
Pontic Greeks
Hamshenis
Iranian Georgians

References

Bibliography 

 Black Sea: Encyclopedic Dictionary (Özhan Öztürk. Karadeniz: Ansiklopedik Sözlük. 2. Cilt. Heyamola Publishing. Istanbul. 2005. .)
 Paul J. Magnarella, The Peasant Venture: Tradition, Migration, and Change among Georgian Peasants in Turkey. (Schenkman Publishing Company: Cambridge, MA, 1979) 
 Mikaberidze, Alexander (ed., 2007). Özkan, Ahmet. Dictionary of Georgian National Biography.

External links 
Chveneburi
Pirosmani / ფიროსმანი
Gezgin, Ulas Basar  (2004) Republican and Post-Republican Responses to New Georgian Nationalisms (PhD Proposal in Anthropology) . teori.org (includes a list of selected publications on the Georgian communities of Turkey)

 
 
Georgian diaspora
Ethnic groups in Georgia (country)
Islam in Georgia (country)
European diaspora in Turkey